Theoretical Criminology is a peer-reviewed academic journal covering the fields of criminology and penology. The journal's editors-in-chief are Mary Francesca Bosworth (University of Oxford) and Simon A. Cole (University of California). It was established in 1997 and is currently published by SAGE Publications.

Abstracting and indexing 
Theoretical Criminology is abstracted and indexed in Scopus and the Social Sciences Citation Index. According to the Journal Citation Reports, its 2013 impact factor is 2.383, ranking it 3 out of 52 journals in the category "Criminology and Penology".

References

External links 
 

SAGE Publishing academic journals
English-language journals
Criminology journals
Quarterly journals
Publications established in 1997